Pedis possessio is a legal phrase in common law used to describe walking on a property to establish ownership. 

This concept involves the establishment of first possession of land. By walking on a property and defining its bounds, possession is established. Legal dictionaries put forth this definition.
Pedis possessio has been described as the actual possession of land within bounds set forth by the need of a mine claimant and operator to improve and work a claim for its mineral value.

Violation of set boundaries are avoided and violence prevented by the establishment of title using the concept of pedis possessio.

See also
Adverse possession

References

Latin legal terminology